The hairlip brotula, Cataetyx messieri, is a viviparous brotula of the genus Cataetyx, found around South America from Argentina to Chile at depths of between  .

References

 Tony Ayling & Geoffrey Cox, Collins Guide to the Sea Fishes of New Zealand,  (William Collins Publishers Ltd, Auckland, New Zealand 1982) 

Bythitidae
Viviparous fish
Fish described in 1878
Taxa named by Albert Günther